Gabrielle d’Estrées, ou Les amours d'Henri IV de France (Gabrielle d’Estrées, or The Loves of Henri IV of France) is an opera in three acts by the French composer Étienne Méhul. It premiered at the Opéra-Comique, Paris on 25 June 1806. The libretto is by Claude Godard d'Aucourt de Saint-Just.

The plot concerns the love affair of King Henri IV with Gabrielle d'Estrées. The opera was removed from the repertoire after its sixth performance on 5 July. According to Arthur Pougin, this was due to the weakness of the work, especially its libretto. However, the musicologist Elizabeth Bartlet believes it was suspended for political reasons. In 1805, Napoleon - then ruler of France - had written to his chief of police Joseph Fouché that he did not want to see Henri IV on stage because the king was too close in time "not to arouse passions. The stage needs a little bit of antiquity and, without causing the theatre too much trouble, I think you ought to prevent this [i.e. showing Henri IV on stage], without appearing to intervene." Méhul's nephew Joseph Daussoigne-Méhul planned a revival in 1818 but it never took place.

Roles

References

Sources
Adélaïde de Place Étienne Nicolas Méhul (Bleu Nuit Éditeur, 2005)
Arthur Pougin Méhul: sa vie, son génie, son caractère (Fischbacher, 1889)
General introduction to Méhul's operas in the  introduction to the edition of Stratonice by M. Elizabeth C. Bartlet (Pendragon Press, 1997)

Operas by Étienne Méhul
1806 operas
Opéras comiques
French-language operas
Operas
Opera world premieres at the Opéra-Comique